Karen Grassle (born February 25, 1942) is an American actress, known for her role as Caroline Ingalls in the NBC television drama series Little House on the Prairie.

Early life
Karen Grassle was born in Berkeley, California, to Frae Ella (née Berry) and Eugene Frederick Grassle on February 25, 1942. She is the elder of two daughters. Her mother was a school teacher, and her father owned and operated a small realty business in Ventura. As a child, she studied ballet, acted in school plays, sang in the Baptist choir, and was vice president of the student body her senior year of high school, being awarded The Girl of the Year award. She graduated from Ventura High School in 1959. She attended H. Sophie Newcomb Memorial College (Tulane University, 1959–60) and then transferred to the University of California, Berkeley. She graduated with BA degrees in 1965 in English and in Dramatic Art. She received a Fulbright Fellowship to the London Academy of Music and Dramatic Art in London. She apprenticed at the Actor's Workshop of San Francisco in 1961–62.

Career
After summers at the Stanford Contemporary Workshop playing leads and two summers at the Colorado Shakespeare Festival playing classical roles, her first professional engagement was a season at the Front Street Theatre, Memphis, Tennessee. upon return from London. While living in New York City, she worked at resident and stock theatres throughout the country, also appearing on PBS in original works and on networks in three soap operas. She made her Broadway debut in the short-lived 1968 play The Gingham Dog. Grassle played in Butterflies Are Free on Broadway (as stand-by with Gloria Swanson, Rosemary Murphy, etc.) as well as at the Elitch Theatre in Denver, Colorado, in June 1972, along with Maureen O'Sullivan and Brandon deWilde, who was killed before leaving town after the performances ended. Grassle starred in the Shakespeare in the Park production of Cymbeline with Christopher Walken, Sam Waterston, and Bill Devane.

Grassle auditioned for the role of the mother, Caroline Ingalls, in the Little House on the Prairie TV series and won the part. The series ran for nine seasons, from 1974 to 1983. After making the pilot for Little House on the Prairie, Grassle appeared in one episode of Gunsmoke titled "The Wiving" as Fran, one of several saloon girls kidnapped. Subsequently, she acted in the features Harry's War, a 1981 American film where she played Kathy, the wife of Edward Herrmann's title character, and Wyatt Earp, a 1994 film starring Kevin Costner. On television, she starred in and co-wrote the NBC-TV film Battered. Other TV movies include Cocaine: One Man's Seduction, Crisis in MidAir, and Between the Darkness and the Dawn. In episodic TV, she starred in Hotel, Love Boat, and Murder She Wrote (twice). She also appeared on Hollywood Squares and numerous talk shows such as Dinah, Merv Griffin, Mike Douglas, and John Davidson. During this period, she lobbied for federal funding for shelters for battered women and appeared in many events to support the Equal Rights Amendment. (Performance of the Year award.)

After the series ended, she moved to Santa Fe, New Mexico and became co-founder and artistic director of Santa Fe's Resource Theater Company. Later she moved to Louisville, Kentucky, where she performed with the company of actors at Actors Theatre of Louisville.

Settling in the San Francisco Bay Area in 2006, Grassle appeared in plays at San Francisco Playhouse, "The Ride Down Mt. Morgan;" "Cabaret." (Outstanding Achievement Award, 2008;) TheatreWorks; Aurora Theatre and out of town in 5 productions of "Driving Miss Daisy" at Manitoba Theatre Center, etc. Independent films "Lasso." 2017, "Not to Forget," 2019
s
Grassle continues to perform in productions in San Francisco, Berkeley, and Palo Alto as well as tours and productions such as Driving Miss Daisy in the starring role of Miss Daisy at the Manitoba Theatre Centre in Winnipeg, Manitoba, Canada in a co-production with Rubicon Theatre and at the Riverside Center for the Performing Arts in Fredericksburg, Virginia. In 2008, she was awarded a prize for her performance in Cabaret at the San Francisco Playhouse. Over the years, she has appeared in commercials such as the promotional face for Premier Bathrooms, a supplier of bathing products for the elderly and infirm.

In 2021, Grassle stars in the film Not to Forget (2021) together with five Academy Award winners: Cloris Leachman, Louis Gossett Jr., Tatum O'Neal, George Chakiris, and Olympia Dukakis. The film, directed by Valerio Zanoli, aims to raise awareness and funds for the fight against Alzheimer's disease.

Personal life
Grassle's memoir, Bright Lights, Prairie Dust: Reflections on Life, Loss, and Love by House's Ma was published November 16, 2021, by She Writes Press. At the date of publication, Grassle resided in the San Francisco Bay Area with her son Zach Radford.

The book detailed her struggles with alcoholism, as well as the troubled relationship she had with her former co-star, Michael Landon. Grassle accused Landon of making derogatory remarks about her while on the set of Little House, often with other members of the cast and crew present, laughing at the comments. Grassle also claimed that her relationship with Landon became strained after she sought a raise, which he refused to give her. 

Grassle subsequently "mended fences" with Landon prior to his death in 1991 from pancreatic cancer.

Filmography

Awards and nominations

References

External links

 
 
 
 
 The Carolyn Jackson Collection, No.52-Interview with Karen Grassle from the Texas Archive of the Moving Image
 About Karen Grassle

20th-century American actresses
21st-century American actresses
21st-century American memoirists
21st-century American women writers
1942 births
Actresses from Berkeley, California
Actresses from California
American film actresses
American stage actresses
American television actresses
Living people
People from Ventura, California
Tulane University alumni
University of California, Berkeley alumni
Alumni of the London Academy of Music and Dramatic Art